

Marquess is a German pop band established in 2006 in Hannover. The group predominantly sings songs in Spanish although with grammar and pronunciation mistakes. Their song "Vayamos compañeros" became very popular in summer 2007 ranking #1 in Poland, Switzerland, and the Czech Republic.

Discography

Albums
 Marquess (2006)
 Frenetica (2007)
 ¡YA! (2008)
 Compañía del sol(2009)
 ¡Bienvenido! (2012)
 Favoritas (2014)
 Sol y Soul (2016)
 En Movimiento (2018)
 Turbulento (2020)

Singles

References

External links
 

German pop music groups
Musical groups from Hanover
Spanish-language singers of Germany
Musical groups established in 2006
2006 establishments in Germany